The Peerless Motor Car Company was an American automobile manufacturer that produced the Peerless brand of motorcars in Cleveland, Ohio, from 1900 to 1931. One of the "Three Ps"Packard, Peerless, and Pierce-Arrowthe company was known for building high-quality luxury automobiles. Peerless popularized a number of vehicle innovations that later became standard equipment, including drum brakes and the first enclosed-body production cars.

History

Established in Cleveland in 1900 at 43 Lisbon Street, Peerless Motors began manufacturing automobiles while using De Dion-Bouton engines under license from the French company. Engineer Louis P. Mooers designed the first Peerless models, as well as several proprietary engines.  The first Peerless-branded vehicles appeared in 1902, with a front-mounted engine driving the rear wheels through a shaft. This later became the standard vehicle propulsion layout for automobiles. In 1904, Mooers designed the Green Dragon racecar and enlisted Barney Oldfield to drive it. The Green Dragon brought notability and success to Peerless, as Oldfield used it to set a number of early world automobile speed records.

In 1905, the  Green Dragon competed in the world's first 24-hour endurance race in Columbus, Ohio. Piloted by Earnest Bollinger, Aurther Feasel, and briefly by Barney Oldfield, the Peerless led the race for the first hour before crashing into a fence, later finishing in 3rd place.

From 1905 to 1907, Peerless experienced a rapid expansion in size and production volume. As the Peerless namesake grew in fame, the company began producing increasingly higher-priced models with a focus on luxury. In 1911, Peerless was one of the first car companies to introduce electric lighting on their vehicles, with electric starters added in 1913. In 1915, the firm introduced its first V8 engine, intending to compete with the Cadillac V8 introduced a year earlier. This model became Peerless' staple production vehicle until 1925, when engines produced by other manufacturers were first used in Peerless models.

During World War I, Peerless manufactured military vehicle chassis and trucks.
One such vehicle, the Peerless armoured car, was manufactured for Great Britain with the Austin Motor Company of Birmingham being the maker of the armored body and Peerless the manufacture of the chassis.  The chassis was manufactured in Cleveland, Ohio.

In 1929, the entire Peerless range was redesigned to compete with other vehicles produced by Stutz and Marmon. This move saw increased sales, and for 1930 another design refresh was undertaken. The Peerless-designed V8 was replaced by a Continental straight-8 as a cost-saving measure.  However, the Great Depression that began in 1929 greatly reduced the sales of luxury automobiles. Peerless stripped down its production and attempted to market one line of vehicles to wealthy Americans who were not affected by the depression. In 1930–31, Peerless commissioned Murphy Body Works to design what the company envisioned as its 1933 model. The task was assigned to a young Frank Hershey, who produced a remarkably clean, elegant vehicle. A single V16-engined 1931 Peerless was finished in June 1931, the last Peerless ever produced.

Peerless remained an idle business until the end of Prohibition in 1933 allowed the manufacture of alcohol. Peerless then revamped its factory and gained a license to brew beer under the  Carling Black Label and Red Cap ale brands from the Brewing Corporation of Canada.

Hershey's single prototype V-16 remained in the Peerless factory until the end of World War II and it is now owned by the Crawford Auto-Aviation Museum.

The following Peerless vehicles are deemed "classic cars" by the Classic Car Club of America (CCCA): 1925 Series 67; 1926 – 1928 Series 69; 1929 Model Eight-125; 1930-1 Custom 8 and the 1932 Deluxe Custom 8.

Gallery of selected models

References

External links

 Peerless Limousine 1908: A non-technical Description of its usefulness - 18-page sales catalog
 The New Peerless 6-80 sales catalog (c.1927)
 Peerless Automobiles at Concceptcarz
 Peerless Motor Car Co. entry from the Encyclopedia of Cleveland History
 The Frederic W. Goudy Collection at the Library of Congress contains illustrated advertising posters for the Peerless Motor Company.
 Tank Chats #26 Peerless Armoured Car Tank Chats #26 Peerless Armoured Car.
 All There Is to Know The 1919 Peerless Armoured Car
 
 

Motor vehicle manufacturers based in Ohio
Defunct motor vehicle manufacturers of the United States
Historic American Engineering Record in Ohio
Manufacturing companies based in Cleveland
Vehicle manufacturing companies established in 1900
Vehicle manufacturing companies disestablished in 1931
1900 establishments in Ohio
1931 disestablishments in Ohio
Defunct companies based in Cleveland
Defunct manufacturing companies based in Ohio
Luxury motor vehicle manufacturers
Luxury vehicles
Veteran vehicles
Brass Era vehicles
Vintage vehicles
1900s cars
1910s cars
1920s cars
1930s cars
Pre-war vehicles
Cars introduced in 1900